Andy Poole may refer to:
 Andy Poole (footballer) (born 1960), English former footballer
 Andy Poole (bassist), musician with Big Big Train

See also
 Andrew Poole, (born 1967), English former footballer